The Turkish Capture of Smyrna, or the Liberation of İzmir marked the end of the 1919–1922 Greco-Turkish War, and the culmination of the Turkish War of Independence. On 9 September 1922, following the headlong retreat of the Greek army after its defeat at the Battle of Dumlupınar and its evacuation from western Anatolia, the Turkish 5th Cavalry Corps under the command of Major-General Fahrettin Altay within Turkish Army under the command of Mustafa Kemal Pasha marched into the city of Smyrna (modern İzmir), bringing three years of Greek occupation to an end.

Accounts of capture

Accounts of the Turkish entry vary in sources. According to Giles Milton, the first Turkish unit to enter the city on 9 September was a cavalry troop that was met by Captain Thesiger of HMS King George V. Captain Thesiger in his report inaccurately stated that he spoke to the 3rd Cavalry Regiment's commander. In reality he spoke with the 13th Cavalry Regiment's commander with Lieutenant Colonel Atıf Esenbel within the 2nd Cavalry Division, as the 3rd Regiment under the command of Colonel Ferit was liberating Karşıyaka under the 14th Cavalry Division. The inaccuracy of British reports throughout the war were also remarked by the British PM Llyod George. Lieutenant Ali Rıza Akıncı's unit also met with a British officer in a car on the railroad tracks near the sea. The officer told them not to enter the city, yet they did not listen and continued their march. At the moment they entered the Kordon they encountered a French captain in a black automobile which urged them to be quick and shouted the following: "Hurry, your homeland is about to be burned. The Armenians will burn the city, save the people, occupy the city at once." The Cavalry continued their march. On their road thousands of Greek soldiers and officers as well as Irregulars were throwing their weapons and surrendering. Though a tense stand-off ensued and a grenade, which failed to explode, was tossed at the feet of the Turkish cavalry officer (The grenade thrower is also mentioned by George Horton as "some fool threw a bomb", and that the commander of the unit "received bloody cuts about the head.") Grace Williamson, of the city's English Nursing Home, remarked, "What a week we have spent!! I believe there was hardly a bit of trouble, only one silly fellow fired at the officers . . . No shooting in the streets!" Captain Şerafettin's horse as a result of the grenade wounds died. Unlike Horton and Williamson, Captain Şerafettin does not use the words fool or silly and mentions the grenade thrower as a civilian who had a sword in his belt. The grenade also wounded the captain.

Lieutenant Ali Rıza Akıncı, the first Turkish officer to hoist the Turkish flag in Smyrna (present day Izmir) on the 9th of September, and his unit of thirteen cavalrymen were ambushed by a volley fire by 30-40 rifles from the Tuzakoğlu factory after being saluted and congratulated by a French Marine platoon in the Halkapınar bridge. This volley of fire killed 3 cavalrymen instantly and fatally wounded another. They were relieved by Captain Şerafettin and his 2 units, which encircled the factory. Moreover, Captain Şerafettin, as well as Lieutenant Ali Rıza Akıncı, were wounded by a grenade thrown by a Greek irregular in front of the Pasaport building. The lieutenant was wounded lightly from his nose and his leg, and his horse from its belly. A monument was later erected on the spot where these cavalrymen were fallen. Pockets of resistance continued; a Turkish Cavalryman was wounded by rifle shots coming from the houses in Kokaryalı neighbourhood.
General of the Fifth Cavalry Corps Fahrettin Altay claims that on 10 September Turkish forces belonging to the 2nd and the 3rd Cavalry Divisions detained 3,000 Greek soldiers, 50 Greek Officers, and a brigadier commander in the south of the city centre, who were retreating from Aydın while the ones with horses were able to escape to Çeşme. Greek soldier Vasilis Diamantopoulos, who in 1922 was among the units that retreated from Aydın, after the local Greeks and other Christians left the city without their belongings and also burnt their own homes so the Turks wouldn't find them intact, was captured along with his entire 18th regiment which was commanded by Colonel Zenginis on the evening of 10 September by the Turkish regular cavalry. Only the left guard unit of Major Vamvakopoulos' batallion was able to escape except the units under the command of Captain Katsikas which surrendered on the 11th of September. 4th Cavalry Regiment under the command of Filibeli Kaymakam-Major Ali Reşat Bey within the 2nd Cavalry Division were among the troops that captured Zenginis and his units. Diamantopoulos however, claimed that a day later the prisoners that were sent away to Manisa amounted to 3,500.

Fire in the city
Just a few days after its capture, a massive fire broke out, consuming the city's Armenian and Greek neighbourhoods. Most scholars believe that the fire was deliberately started by Mustafa Kemal's men, in an effort to accelerate the ethnic cleansing of the last remaining urban Christian community in the Ottoman Empire outside Constantinople. Turkish soldiers carried out atrocities against the local population even as the fire raged, in full view of Allied warships at anchor in the harbour and a number of Western diplomats and journalists. Thousands were killed and many more escaped in the aftermath, as the centuries-long presence of the Greek and Armenian communities was extinguished. The Jewish and Muslim quarters were not damaged in the fire.

Legacy
9 September is a local holiday commemorating the Turkish capture of Smyrna. Dokuz Eylül University (9 September University) is named in honour of it. Mustafa Kemal (later Atatürk), who founded the Republican People's Party, chose 9 September 1923 as the official date of establishment of his party to commemorate the capture.

See also
 Outline and timeline of the Greek genocide
Greek landing at Smyrna
Burning of Smyrna
On the Quai at Smyrna (Hemingway story)

References

Battles of the Greco-Turkish War (1919–1922)
20th century in İzmir
September 1922 events
Conflicts in 1922
1922 in the Ottoman Empire
1922 in Greece